González Island is a small island on the south side of the entrance to Iquique Cove, Discovery Bay, Greenwich Island in the South Shetland Islands. On its west side the island is linked by a split to a smaller island, which is covered at high tide. The island was charted by the Chilean Antarctic Expedition of 1947, and commanded by Capitan de Navio Federico Guesalaga Toro, who named it after Ernesto González Navarrete, captain of the ship Iquique on the expedition.

See also 
 List of antarctic and sub-antarctic islands

Maps 
 L.L. Ivanov. Antarctica: Livingston Island and Greenwich, Robert, Snow and Smith Islands. Scale 1:120000 topographic map.  Troyan: Manfred Wörner Foundation, 2009.

References

Islands of the South Shetland Islands